Dikoleps templadoi is a minute species of sea snail, a marine gastropod mollusk in the family Skeneidae.

Description
The height of the shell attains 0.8 mm.

Distribution
This species occurs in the Mediterranean Sea off Spain.

References

 Rubio F., Dantart L. & Luque A. (2004). El género Dikoleps (Gastropoda, Skeneidae) en las costas ibéricas. Iberus, 22(1): 113–132

External links
 

templadoi
Gastropods described in 2004